Dr. Mariam Nour (born May 24, 1936) is a Lebanese television personality and author, who discusses food and lifestyle issues in the Lebanese and Arab media, and an expert in the Macrobiotic diet and the science of alternative medicine.

Life and career 
Nour was born in Douma, Lebanon as Marie Manuel Yeghiayan to an Armenian father and Lebanese mother, she mentioned that Musa al-Sadr had named her as Mariam Nour.

She traveled to the United States where she was taught by Osho and Michio Kushi. She survived hereditary breast cancer as she healed herself naturally.

With her return to Lebanon in the late 1990s, Nour brought new age ideas to the Arab world. She presented many programs on the Lebanese Al Jadeed (New TV) station and appeared at various times on Al Jazeera Arabic and other Arab stations promoting her views and lifestyle. Nour is a dual citizen of Lebanon and the United States.

See also 
 List of Lebanese Armenians
 Armenians in Lebanon
 Armenian diaspora

References

External links 
 

1936 births
Living people
People from Batroun District
Spiritual teachers
Lebanese people of Armenian descent
Lebanese conspiracy theorists